The International Association of National Public Health Institutes (IANPHI) is an international umbrella organization of national public health institutes (NPHIs), public health government agencies working to improve national disease prevention and response. IANPHI is made up of 100+ members, located in more than 90 countries. An important goal of IANPHI is to improve health outcomes by strengthening NPHIs or supporting countries in creating new NPHIs.

As of 2021 IANPHI’s president is professor Duncan Selbie, former chief executive of Public Health England. The IANPHI Secretariat is based at Santé Publique France, and the US Office is located at the Emory University Global Health Institute in Atlanta, GA. The IANPHI Foundation is located in Finland at the Finnish Institute for Health and Welfare. Coordinated by Secretary General Jean Claude Desenclos, the IANPHI team is responsible for member relations and programs, policy, communications and NPHI development projects, and the IANPHI annual meeting.

At its inception (2002-2006), IANPHI received seed funds from the Rockefeller Foundation and a one-year planning grant from the Bill & Melinda Gates Foundation (BMGF). BMGF subsequently awarded multi-year funds for IANPHI's development and to support projects to build NPHIs in low- and middle-income countries. Resources have since been contributed e.g. by the Centers for Disease Control and Prevention (CDC) A recent role for IANPHI has been to work with the Child Health and Mortality Prevention Surveillance (CHAMPS) project.

The National Public Health Institute model
The national public health institutes (NPHI) model, exemplified by the U.S. Centers for Disease Control and Prevention (CDC), Chinese Center for Disease Control and Prevention (China CDC), Public Health Agency of Canada (PHAC), Instituto Nacional de Salud Pública of Mexico (INSP Mexico),  Oswaldo Cruz Foundation of Brazil (FIOCRUZ Brazil) and others, is an effective and cost-efficient way to systematically develop and sustain national public health systems. NPHIs have been major contributors to reductions in morbidity and mortality from infectious and noncommunicable conditions. Many, including the U.S. CDC and the National Institute for Health and Welfare (Finland), have developed over several decades, while others, including NPHIs in Liberia and Canada, were created following threats such as Ebola and SARS, in recognition that a coordinated system with a specialized institution is needed to effectively respond to disease threats.

NPHIs usually lead national efforts for disease surveillance and outbreak investigation (to monitor population health trends and detect and resolve outbreaks), laboratory services (to identify and confirm disease threats), health programs (including recommendations for immunizations and maternal and child health initiatives), and public health workforce development and research (including new treatments and technologies). NPHIs are designed to give governments the ability to assess and address major acute and long-term disease threats in a country using scientific, evidence-based policies and strategies, as well as create a career home for public health researchers and scientists, thereby fostering the evidence-based approaches necessary to ensure that government policies are based on scientific evidence rather than politics.

History and activities
In 2002, the directors of nearly 30 NPHIs met in Bellagio, Italy to share best practices and discuss opportunities for collaboration. In 2004, the group reconvened in Helsinki and declared its intention to forge an alliance.

IANPHI was formally launched at the first General Assembly in Brazil in January 2006, with 39 founding members and a one-year grant from the Gates Foundation. Under a subsequent five-year grant from the Gates Foundation awarded in late 2006, the membership has expanded to 100 institutes in 88 countries around the world.

IANPHI's activities fall into three areas:
 Projects (targeting investments to create or strengthen NPHIs in low-resource countries)
 Policy (developing a framework, tools and policy papers for public health system strengthening)
 Leadership development (creating an international community of NPHI directors)

Peer-to-Peer Partnerships
One of IANPHI's distinctive features and strengths is a peer-assistance approach that facilitates sharing of expertise and experience among member NPHIs.  The model clearly benefits the recipient NPHI by identifying strategies to address priority needs and raising standards of performance for organizing and conducting public health functions. But it rewards the contributing institute as well – by sharing skills and assets to benefit others while also linking resources and solutions to address regional and global health threats and opportunities.

For the network of IANPHI members, the model provides unique opportunities for NPHIs to link with others that are geographically or linguistically similar or are struggling with similar technical or programmatic issues, such as information system development or pandemic preparedness.  This collaborative approach also provides a platform for developing research or programs to address shared issues, whether laboratory safety or avian influenza, tobacco use or injury.

Recent peer-to-peer partnerships include:
 Peru and Bolivia - INLASA Partnership 
 Norway and Malawi - Host Workshop  and Peer-to-Peer organizational development 
 UK and Kenya - Science-to-Policy Expertise
 Canada and Kenya - Study Tour 
 Morocco and Togo - Strengthening Information Systems
 UK and Uganda - Communications and Advocacy 
 France and Togo - Epidemic Intelligence and Disease Surveillance 
 France and Togo/Côte d'Ivoire - Influencing Policy through Publication

List of IANPHI members

 Afghanistan: Afghan Public Health Institute
 Albania: Public Health Institute
 Algeria: Institut National de Santé Publique (INSP)
 Angola: National Institute of Public Health
 Argentina: National Laboratories and Health Institutes Administration (ANLIS)
 Armenia: National Center for Disease Control
 Armenia: Armenian National Institute of Health
 Austria: Gesundheit Österreich GmbH (GÖG)
 Bangladesh: Institute of Epidemiology, Disease Control & Research - IEDCR
 Belgium: Sciensano
 Bolivia: Health Laboratories National Institute (INLASA)
 Brazil: Oswaldo Cruz Foundation - FIOCRUZ
 Bulgaria: National Center of Public Health and Analyses (NCPHA)
 Burkina Faso: Institut National de Sante Publique (INSP)
 Burundi: National Institute of Public Health
 Cabo Verde: Instituto Nacional de Saúde Pública (INSP)
 Cambodia : National Institute of Public Health
 Cameroon: Direction de la Lutte Contre la Maladie, les Epidemies, et les Pandemies (DLM)
 Canada: Public Health Agency of Canada
 Canada: Institut national de santé publique du Quebec
 China: Chinese Center for Disease Control and Prevention
 China: Centre for Health Protection, Hong Kong
 Colombia: National Institute of Public Health
 Costa Rica: National Institute for Research on Nutrition and Health
 Côte d'Ivoire : National Institute of Public Health 
 Croatia: Croatian Institute for Public Health
 Cuba: Institute of Tropical Medicine "Pedro Kouri"
 Czech Republic: National Institute of Public Health
 Denmark: Statens Institut for Folkesundhed
 Denmark: Statens Serum Institut (SSI)
 Ecuador: National Institute of Public Health Research
 El Salvador: National Institute of Public Health
 Estonia: National Institute for Health and Development
 Ethiopia : Ethiopian Public Health Institute 
 Finland: National Institute for Health and Welfare (THL)
 France: Santé publique France
 Georgia: Georgia National Center for Disease Control and Public Health (NCDC)
 Germany: Robert Koch Institute
 Germany: Bundeszentrale für gesundheitliche Aufklärung (BZgA)
 Ghana: Noguchi Memorial Institute for Medical Research
 Ghana: Ghana Health Service
 Guatemala: Centro Nacional de Ciencias de la Salud (CNCS)
 Guinea: Agence Nationale de Sécurité Sanitaire (ANSS)
 Guinea: National Institute of Public Health Guinea (Guinea NPHI)
 Guinea Bissau: National Institute of Public Health (INASA)
 India: National Centre for Disease Control 
 Iran Islamic Republic: Institute of Public Health Research
 Ireland: The Institute of Public Health in Ireland
 Israel: Israel Center for Disease Control
 Italy: National Institute of Health
 Jordan: Jordan Ministry of Health
 Kazakhstan: National Center for Public Healthcare
 Kenya: Kenya Medical Research Institute (KEMRI)
 Kenya: Kenya National Public Health Institute
 Liberia: National Public Health Institute of Liberia (NPHIL)
 Libya: Libya National Centre for Disease Control
 Macedonia FYR: Institute for Public Health of the R. Macedonia
 Madagascar: Ministère de la santé publique
 Malawi: Public Health Institute of Malawi 
 Mexico: National Institute of Public Health
 Moldova: National Center of Public Health
 Mongolia : National Center for Public Health
 Morocco: Pasteur Institute of Morocco
 Morocco: National Institute of Hygiene
 Morocco: Direction of Epidemiology and Disease Control
 Mozambique: National Institute of Health 
 Myanmar: National Health Laboratory
 Myanmar: Ministry of Health and Sports
 Nepal: School of Public Health and Community Medicine B.P. Koirala Institute of Health Sciences
 Netherlands: Netherlands National Institute for Public Health and the Environment
 Nigeria: Nigerian Institute of Medical Research (NIMR)
 Nigeria: Nigeria Centre for Disease Control
 Nigeria: National Primary Health Care Development Agency
 Norway: Norwegian Institute of Public Health
 Pakistan: Pakistan National Institute of Health
 Palestine: Palestinian National Institute of Public Health
 Panama: Gorgas Memorial Institute for Health Studies
 Papua New Guinea: National Department of Health
 Peru : Peruvian National Institute of Health
 Poland : National Institute of Public Health
 Portugal: Institute of Hygiene and Tropical Medicine
 Portugal: National Institute of Health INSA
 Republic of Korea: Korea Centers for Disease Control and Prevention
 Russian Federation: National Research Center for Preventive Medicine
 Rwanda: Institute of HIV/AIDS, Diseases Prevention and Control
 Saudi Arabia: Centers for Disease Control
 Serbia: Institute of Public Health of Serbia
 Sierra Leone: Ministry of Health & Sanitation
 Slovenia: National Institute of Public Health (NIJZ)
 Somalia: National Institute of Health (NIH)
 South Africa: National Institute for Communicable Diseases (NICD)
 Spain: Carlos III Health Institute (ISCIII, Instituto de Salud Carlos III)
 Sudan: National Public Health Institute
 Sweden: Public Health Agency of Sweden
 Syria: Center for Strategic Health Studies
 Tanzania: National Institute for Medical Research - NIMR
 Thailand: National Institute of Health
 Timor Leste: National Institute of Public Health
 Togo: National Institute of Hygiene 
 Tunisia: National Institute of Health
 Turkey: Refik Saydam Hygiene Center
 Uganda: Uganda Virus Research Institute UVRI 
 Uganda: Uganda National Institute of Public Health
 Ukraine: Public Health Center of Ukraine
 United Kingdom England: Public Health England (PHE)
 United Kingdom Wales: Public Health Wales
 United States: Centers for Disease Control and Prevention
 Vietnam: National Institute of Hygiene and Epidemiology - NIHE
 Zambia: Zambian National Public Health Institute
 Zimbabwe: National Public Health Institute

Organization
IANPHI is managed by an executive board and secretariat. Executive board members consider and vote on issues of strategic direction and policy and on project and funding recommendations. There are currently 14 active members on the executive board:

 Duncan Selbie - IANPHI President, Former Chief Executive, Public Health England, United Kingdom
 Meerjady Sabrina Flora - IANPHI Vice President, Former Director General, Institute of Epidemiology, Disease Control and Research and National Influenza Center, Bangladesh
 André van der Zande - Immediate Past President, IANPHI, Former Director General, National Institute for Public Health and the Environment, The Netherlands
 Martha Lucia Ospina - Director, Instituto Nacional de Salud, Colombia
 George F. Gao - Director, Chinese Center for Disease Control and Prevention, China
 Ebba Abate - Director, Ethiopian Public Health Institute (EPHI), Ethiopia
 Lothar H. Wieler - President, Robert Koch Institute, Germany
 Juan Rivera Dommarco - Director, Instituto Nacional de Salud Pública, Mexico
 Camilla Stoltenberg - Director General, Norwegian Institute of Public Health, Norway
 Akhmetov Valikhan Isaevich - Former Director, National Centre for Public Healthcare, Kazakhstan
 Abdullah Algwizani - Chief Executive Officer, Saudi Centers for Disease Control, Saudi Arabia
 Aamer Ikram - Executive Director, National Institute of Health, Pakistan
 Sabin Nsanzimana - Director General, Rwanda Biomedical Center, Rwanda
 Markku Tervahauta - Director General, Finnish Institute of Health and Welfare, Finland

Emeritus Members
 Igbal Abukarig - Director, Public Health Institute, Sudan
 Paulo Buss - Former President, Oswaldo Cruz Foundation/FIOCRUZ, Brazil
 Reinhard Burger - President, Robert Koch Institute, Germany
 David Butler Jones - Director, Public Health Agency of Canada
 Cesar Cabezas - Director, National Institute of Health, Peru
 L. S. Chauhan - Director, National Centre for Disease Control, India
 Rajae El Aouad - Former Director, National Institute of Hygiene, Morocco
 Naima El Mdaghri - Director General, Institut Pasteur du Maroc, Morocco
 Mohammed Hassar - Former Director, Institute Pasteur du Maroc, Morocco
 Mauricio Hernández-Avila - IANPHI Immediate Past President, Former Director, National Institute of Public Health, Mexico
 Oni Idigbe - Former Director General & Director of Research, Nigerian Institute of Medical Research, Nigeria
 Ilesh Jani - Director General, National Institute of Health, Mozambique
 Amha Kebede - Director, Ethiopian Public Health Institute, Ethiopia
 Jeffrey Koplan, IANPHI Senior Advisor, Vice President for Global Health, Emory University, USA
 Justin McCracken - Former Chief Executive, Health Protection Agency, United Kingdom
 Tsehaynesh Messele - Former Director General, Health and Nutrition Research Institute, Ethiopia
 Pekka Puska - Former IANPHI President, Former Director General, National Institute for Health and Welfare, Finland
 Mahmudur Rahman - Director, Institute of Epidemiology, Disease Control, and Research, Bangladesh
 Amabelia Rodrigues - Former President, National Institute of Public Health, Guinea Bissau
 Mario Henry Rodriguez - Former General Director, National Institute of Public Health, Mexico
 Pathom Sawanpanyalert - Former Director General, National Institute of Health
 Barry Schoub - Former Executive Director, National Institute of Communicable Diseases, South Africa
 Marc Sprenger - Director, European Centre for Disease Prevention and Control, Netherlands
 Geir Stene-Larsen - Director General, Norwegian Institute of Public Health
 Gregory Taylor - Chief Public Health Officer, Public Health Agency of Canada, Canada
 Jaroslav Volf - Former Director, National Institute of Public Health, Czech Republic
 Yu Wang - Director-General, Centers for Disease Control, China
 Jane Wilde - Former Chief Executive, Institute of Public Health in Ireland

The IANPHI Secretariat is based at the Santé Publique France, and the US Office is located at the Emory University Global Health Institute in Atlanta, GA.

IANPHI long-term projects
IANPHI's long-term projects help public health systems in low-resource countries respond to modern public health challenges, improve outcomes, and support healthy populations and strong economies. These intensive multi-year engagements develop and strengthen national public health institutes (NPHIs), moving them forward on a continuum from those least developed to those with a comprehensive and coordinated scope of public health responsibilities.  Currently, IANPHI has ongoing long-term projects in Bangladesh, Ethiopia, Ghana, Guinea-Bissau, Malawi, Morocco, Mozambique, Nigeria, Tanzania, and Togo.

See also
 List of national public health agencies

References

External links
 

Public health organizations
International medical and health organizations
International organizations based in France